The 2007 Duke Blue Devils football team represented the Duke University in the 2007 NCAA Division I FBS football season. The team was led by head coach Ted Roof. They played their homes games at Wallace Wade Stadium in Durham, North Carolina.

Schedule

References

Duke
Duke Blue Devils football seasons
Duke Blue Devils football